Hereford Rowing Club is a rowing club on the River Wye, based at 37 Greyfriars Avenue, Hereford, Herefordshire.

History
The club was founded in 1859 when the first regatta in Hereford was held. The present clubhouse was built in 1958 and the eights boathouse was built three years before in 1958, on the same site as the original boathouse. The club won the prestigious Britannia Challenge Cup at the Henley Regatta in 1971 and produced a national champion crew in 2010.

Notable members
 Colin Barratt
 Clive Roberts

Honours

British champions

Henley Royal Regatta

References

Sport in Herefordshire
Rowing clubs in England
Hereford